Keren may refer to:

Places

Inhabited places
 Keren, Eritrea, a city in Eritrea, formerly called Cheren
 Keren Subregion, Anseba region, Eritrea

Other places
 House of Keren, a historical house in Taganrog, Rostov Oblast, Russia
 Keren, a crater on Mars

Other uses
 Battle of Keren, part of the East African Campaign in World War II
 Keren (given name)
 Keren (kabuki), Kabuki stagecraft
 Keren – Vocational Rehabilitation Centers in Israel, an Israeli public trust organization dedicated to vocational rehabilitation
 Keren-happuch, the youngest daughter of Job (biblical figure)
 Keren, a composition for solo trombone by Greek composer Iannis Xenakis
 Keren Kayemet, or the Jewish National Fund

See also
 Kerens (disambiguation)